Inhaca Airport  is an airport near Inhaca, a town on Inhaca Island, in the Maputo Province in Mozambique. It is located across Maputo Bay from the country's capital city of Maputo.

Facilities

References

External links
 Photos and map of Maputo
 

Airports in Mozambique
Buildings and structures in Maputo Province